Kira Marije Toussaint (born 22 May 1994) is a Dutch competitive swimmer who specialises in backstroke. She is the former world record holder in the short course 50 metre backstroke and the Dutch record holder in the long course 50 metre backstroke and 100 metre backstroke, and the short course 50 metre, 100 metre, and 200 metre backstroke. She also holds the European record in the long course and short course 50 metre backstroke. At the 2021 FINA Swimming World Cup, Toussaint placed second overall for a competitor of any gender in terms of total points scored and earned 11 gold medals.

Career

2012 European Short Course Championships
In the semifinals of the 2012 European Short Course Championships in Chartres, France, she broke the Dutch record in the 100 meter backstroke (short course) with a time of 57.16 s. She finished 4th in the final.

2016 Summer Olympics

Toussaint qualified for the 2016 Summer Olympics in Rio de Janeiro in the 100 meter backstroke. Her time of 1:00.25 exactly matched the Olympic Qualifying Time. She finished 18th in the heats and did not advance to the semifinals.

2018–2020
In December 2019, Toussaint was found innocent and that no anti-doping rule violation had occurred following an investigation by FINA of one of her doping test sample results from 2 November 2018. FINA had earlier dropped its accusations against Toussaint in March 2019.

International Swimming League
In 2019 she was member of the 2019 International Swimming League representing Team Iron. She finished second in both the 50 and the 100 backstroke in London. In 2020 International Swimming League she represented London Roar.

2021 Swimming World Cup
Toussaint competed in the 2021 FINA Swimming World Cup, where she earned a total of 11 medals, all of which were gold medals. Her performances across all four stops of the World Cup circuit were dominant enough for her to place second overall in terms of total points scored by a competitor, male or female, for all four stops, a total of 227.4 points, and she earned $103,500 of prize money. FINA ranked the accomplishment of Toussaint winning a gold medal in every backstroke event she raced in the month-long World Cup competition as their number six moment from the competition.

Personal life
Toussaint is the daughter of Jolanda de Rover, the Olympic gold medalist in the 200 meter backstroke at the 1984 Summer Olympics in Los Angeles.

Personal bests

Awards and honours
 FINA, Top 10 Moments: 2021 Swimming World Cup (#6)

References

External links
 

1994 births
Living people
Sportspeople from Amstelveen
Dutch expatriate sportspeople in the United States
Dutch female backstroke swimmers
Dutch female freestyle swimmers
Olympic swimmers of the Netherlands
Swimmers at the 2016 Summer Olympics
Tennessee Volunteers women's swimmers
Universiade medalists in swimming
European Aquatics Championships medalists in swimming
European Championships (multi-sport event) silver medalists
Universiade gold medalists for the Netherlands
Medalists at the 2017 Summer Universiade
World record holders in swimming
Swimmers at the 2020 Summer Olympics
World Aquatics Championships medalists in swimming
Medalists at the FINA World Swimming Championships (25 m)
21st-century Dutch women
Florida Gulf Coast Eagles women's swimmers